The Ohio Women's Convention at Akron in 1851 met on May 28-29, 1851 at Akron, Ohio. There, the abolitionist and preacher, Sojourner Truth, delivered one of the most famous speeches in American history. The speech, which did not have a title at the time, became known as the 'Ain't I a Woman?' speech.

History 
The Ohio Women's Convention at Akron met for two days on May 28-29, 1851 in Akron, Ohio. The convention was led by Francis Dana Barker Gage, who had previously presided over a similar event in McConnelsville. The convention was not well received locally and several men, including local ministers, heckled speakers at it. During the convention, one of the speakers was the abolitionist and preacher, Sojourner Truth, who gave what became one of the most notable speeches in American women's history. Without a title at the time, the speech later became known under the title of  'Ain't I a Woman?' Truth was the only black woman in attendance at the conference and many of the other women present did not want her to speak. Truth delivered the speech from the steps of the Old Stone Church, on the second day of the convention. The church was located in downtown Akron, but is no longer standing. It was published by journalist Marius Robinson in The Anti-Slavery Bugle on June 21, 1851.

Legacy 
In 2022 the Summit Suffrage Centennial Committee is due to unveil a statue of Sojourner Truth in Akron, commemorating the speech. The commissioned work is made of bronze, ten feet tall and will be cast by the local artist Woodrow Nash. Groundbreaking for the surrounding park, the Sojourner Truth Memorial Plaza, occurred in August 2022.

See also 

 List of women's rights conventions in the United States
 Women's suffrage in Ohio
Ohio Women's Convention at Massillon in 1852

References 

History of women's rights in the United States
1851 in the United States
Feminism and history
History of women in Ohio
1851 in Ohio
1851 conferences
May 1851 events
Women's conferences
Ohio suffrage